"You Know How We Do It" is a 1993 song by American rapper, actor and filmmaker Ice Cube, released as the second single from his fourth studio album, Lethal Injection. It was released on February 2, 1994 and was a No. 30 hit on the Billboard Hot 100.

Genre
Musically the song is in the G-funk genre, and has the same kind of mood and feeling as "It Was a Good Day".

Samples
The song samples "The Show Is Over" by Evelyn "Champagne" King, "Summer Madness" by Kool & the Gang, and "Billie Jean" by Michael Jackson.

Music video

The accompanying music video for "You Know How We Do It" was directed by American film and music video director Marcus Raboy and filmed in Las Vegas, Nevada. It features Ice Cube driving in a convertible Jaguar XJS and standing on top of casinos.

In popular culture
The song first appeared on the soundtrack of the 1993 film Surf Ninjas. Mariah Carey sampled "You Know How We Do It" in her song "Irresistible (West Side Connection)" from her 2002 album Charmbracelet; it features Ice Cube as part of the hip hop supergroup the Westside Connection, which also included Mack 10 and WC. The song was also featured in Sonic The Hedgehog 2 and Grand Theft Auto V.

Track listing
"You Know How We Do It"
"You Know How We Do It (Instrumental)"
"2 n the Morning"
"2 n the Morning (Instrumental)"

Charts

Certifications

References

1994 singles
1994 songs
G-funk songs
Ice Cube songs
Music videos directed by Marcus Raboy
Priority Records singles
Songs written by Ice Cube